Mitchell Otis Page (October 15, 1951 – March 12, 2011) was a Major League Baseball player.

Page played the role of the California Angels first baseman, "Abascal", in the  Disney movie Angels in the Outfield.

Early years
Page was born in Los Angeles, California. He originally drafted out of Centennial High School in Compton, California by the A's in the fourth round of the 1970 Major League Baseball Draft, but chose instead to attend Compton Community College. After transferring to California State Polytechnic University, Pomona, he was drafted by the Pittsburgh Pirates in the third round of the 1973 Major League Baseball Draft.

After hitting 43 home runs and driving in 173 runs with a .292 batting average over two seasons in the Pirates' farm system, the A's finally acquired Page on March 15, 1977, along with Tony Armas, Doc Medich, Doug Bair, Dave Giusti and Rick Langford for Phil Garner, Chris Batton and Tommy Helms.

Oakland A's
Immediately upon joining his new club, Page assumed the job of everyday left fielder, and showed poise with a promising career ahead of him when he batted .307 with 21 home runs, 75 runs batted in and 42 stolen bases for the Oakland Athletics in his rookie year. He collected nine votes to Murray's twelve to finish second in voting for the AL Rookie of the Year Award.  His impressive start to the 1977 season earned him a spot on the cover of the June 4 issue of The Sporting News.

Page had a respectable  season, batting .285 with seventeen home runs and 70 RBIs. He got into a contract dispute with A's owner Charlie Finley during Spring training , and wound up getting suspended by the owner for refusing to play in exhibition games. He was used as the designated hitter during the regular season as injuries had limited his range in the outfield. He produced just a .247 batting average with nine home runs and 42 RBIs in his new role.

Page batted just .146 with four home runs and thirteen RBIs in the first half of the strike shortened  season. When play resumed in August, Page saw just three more at-bats for the rest of the season, spending most of his time with the triple A Tacoma Tigers. The A's won the first half of the season; Page was kept off the roster for 1981 American League Division Series against the Kansas City Royals and the 1981 American League Championship Series against the New York Yankees.

Pittsburgh Pirates
Page was released by the A's during Spring training . He signed a minor league deal with the Pittsburgh Pirates shortly afterwards, and in twelve at bats, hit .333, with three walks as a pinch hitter in August.

In 673 games over 8 seasons, Page compiled a .266 batting average (560-for-2104) with 297 runs, 72 home runs and 259 RBI.

Coaching career
Page returned to Tacoma as their hitting coach from  through , and served as first base coach for the Kansas City Royals from 1995 to 1997.

Midway through the  season, he was promoted to the St. Louis Cardinals as hitting coach. He remained with the club through the 2004 World Series, but left the post immediately afterwards to enter an alcohol treatment facility near his Oakland, California home. The Cards batted just .190 in the World Series against the Boston Red Sox.

Page left the job in May 2007 due to a relapse of his alcoholism. He returned to the organization later in the year as a roving minor league instructor. He rejoined the Cardinals' organization, and began  as a coach with the Quad Cities River Bandits, but left in May due to "personal reasons."

Death
Page died in his sleep on March 12, at the age of 59. The cause of death was not immediately disclosed.

See also
 List of St. Louis Cardinals coaches

References

External links

Pura Pelota (Venezuelan Winter League)
The sudden death of Mitchell Page

1951 births
2011 deaths
African-American baseball coaches
African-American baseball players
Baseball players from Los Angeles
Charleston Charlies players
Cal Poly Pomona Broncos baseball players
Hawaii Islanders players
Kansas City Royals coaches
Major League Baseball designated hitters
Major League Baseball hitting coaches
Major League Baseball left fielders
Male actors from Greater Los Angeles
Minor league baseball coaches
Navegantes del Magallanes players
American expatriate baseball players in Venezuela
Oakland Athletics players
Pittsburgh Pirates players
Salem Pirates players
Shreveport Captains players
St. Louis Cardinals coaches
Tacoma Tigers players
Washington Nationals coaches
20th-century African-American sportspeople
21st-century African-American people